Almost Normal is a 2005 comedy-drama film directed by Marc Moody and starring J. Andrew Keitch, Tim Hammer, and Joan Lauckner.

Plot synopsis
Brad Jenkins, a 40-year-old gay college professor, is still uncomfortable in his own skin. After a disagreement with his mother, he storms out of his home, claiming that he is "going somewhere where [he] is more normal." A sudden car accident propels him back to his youth and into a world in which gay is "normal" and being straight is not accepted. Brad has to weigh whether to remain in the past and be "normal" or attempt to return to his old life. A local jock, who had ignored him before, now dates him. However, he grows attracted to a girl – his best friend/sister-in-law in the heteronormative world. The couple attempts to deal with the pressures of being straight in a gay world. Eventually, everyone dances with people of the opposite sex at the school ball, even though they are in the homonormative world, showing Brad's "acceptance" of his straightness in the past and his gay self in real life. He then returns to his life as a professor and re-unites with the jock, who turns out to be the gay father of a student of Brad's.

Cast
 J. Andrew Keitch as Brad Jenkins
 Joan Lauckner as Julie Erwin
 Tim Hammer as Roland Davis
 Nils Haaland as Terry
 Kehry Anson Lane as Bill Dempson
 Joel Egger as Dwayne Twillis
 Virginia Smith as Doris Jenkins
 Brad Buffum as Bob Jenkins
 Mary Douglass as Louise Baker
 Steve Balsarini as Halbert Baker
 John Brennan as Mr. Thompson
 Adam Jefferis as Steven Davis
 Katherine Nora Leroy as Yolanda
 Stan Brown as Mr. Fock
 Eric Smith as Keith Stevens
 Paige Edwards as Little Girl

Reception

Awards
Almost Normal won the Best of the Fest award at the 2005 Breckenridge Festival of Film.

See also
 List of American films of 2005

References

External links
 
 
 
 Review summary from the New York Times website
 
 

2000s fantasy comedy-drama films
2005 comedy-drama films
2005 films
2005 LGBT-related films
American fantasy comedy-drama films
American LGBT-related films
Films about time travel
Gay-related films
LGBT-related comedy-drama films
2000s English-language films
2000s American films